Chaika ( - Seagull) is a 2015 Russian documentary film about the corrupt affairs and some other crimes of Prosecutor General of Russia Yury Chaika and his sons, Artyom Chaika and Igor Chaika.

Content
The film tells about crimes of Chaika family, connections with criminal leaders and acquiring enterprises.

Award
Winner of Artdocfest festival (nominee ArtDocSet') in 2015.

In Media
On 3 February 2016, the group Pussy Riot released a satirical music video titled Chaika, alluding to Navalny's findings.

References

External links 
 
 Official video by Anti-Corruption Foundation
 Chaika - full story by Alexei Navalny's Anti-Corruption Foundation (in Russian)

2015 films
2015 documentary films
Russian documentary films
Anti-Corruption Foundation films
2010s Russian-language films
2015 YouTube videos